Events from the year 1999 in Pakistan.

Incumbents

Federal government
President: Muhammad Rafiq Tarar 
Prime Minister: Nawaz Sharif (until 12 October)
Chief Justice: Ajmal Mian (until 30 June), Saeeduzzaman Siddiqui

Governors
Governor of Balochistan – 
 until 17 August: Miangul Aurangzeb
 17 August-25 October: Sayed Muhammad Fazal Agha
 starting 25 October: Amir-ul-Mulk Mengal
Governor of Khyber Pakhtunkhwa – 
 until 17 August: Arif Bangash
 17 August-21 October: Miangul Aurangzeb
 starting 21 October: Mohammad Shafiq
Governor of Punjab – 
 until 18 August: Shahid Hamid 
 18 August-25 October: Zulfiqar Ali Khosa
 starting 25 October: Muhammad Safdar
Governor of Sindh – 
 until 17 June: Moinuddin Haider
 19 June-12 October: Mamnoon Hussain
 starting 25 October: Azim Daudpota

Events
 Pakistan tests its Ghauri II missile.

May
 20 May – massive hurricane strikes Sindh.
 	3 May – 26 July The Kargil conflict between Pakistan and India begins.
 31 May – Bangladesh defeats the Pakistan cricket team during the world cup.

June
 20 June – The Pakistan cricket team lose the 1999 World cup final to Australia at Lords.

October
12 October – Nawaz Sharif is deposed in a coup d'état by general Pervez Musharraf.

November
 23 November – Pakistan is suspended from the commonwealth, after emergency rule is applied following the coup.

See also
1998 in Pakistan
Other events of 1999
2000 in Pakistan
Timeline of Pakistani history

References